Jack Cassar (born January 19, 1997) is a professional Canadian football linebacker for the Toronto Argonauts of the Canadian Football League (CFL).

University career
Cassar played U Sports football for the Carleton Ravens from 2016 to 2019. He played in 31 regular season games where he had 153.5 tackles, eight sacks, and one interception. He was named a U Sports First Team All-Canadian and the OUA Stand-up Defensive Player of the Year in 2019 as he played in seven games where he had 44 tackles, four sacks, seven tackles for a loss, and one fumble recovery.

Professional career
Cassar was drafted in the second round, 11th overall, in the 2020 CFL Draft by the Toronto Argonauts, but did not play in 2020 due to the cancellation of the 2020 CFL season. He then signed with the team on March 25, 2021. Cassar made the team following training camp and played in his first career professional game on August 7, 2021, against the Calgary Stampeders. However, he suffered a hip injury in that game and was placed on the team's six-game injured list. He returned to play on October 6, 2021, against the Ottawa Redblacks, where he earned his first professional start at middle linebacker, in just his second professional game.

Personal life
Cassar first played gridiron football in Dubai where he attended school from grade 5 to grade 8.

References

External links
Toronto Argonauts bio 

1997 births
Living people
Canadian football linebackers
Carleton Ravens football players
Players of Canadian football from Ontario
Sportspeople from Mississauga
Toronto Argonauts players